Tangimoe Clay is a New Zealand weaver and textile artist. She is affiliated with the Whakatōhea iwi. Her artworks are held by the Auckland Art Gallery Toi o Tāmaki and the Museum of New Zealand Te Papa Tongarewa.

Biography 
Clay is a weaver from Ōpōtiki who has exhibited in New Zealand as well as internationally. She became interested in working with flax in the late 1980s. Clay has artworks in the collections of the Auckland Art Gallery and Te Papa Tongarewa. In 2014 Clay enrolled with Te Wānanga o Aotearoa to study towards a Bachelor of Māori Visual Arts - Maunga Kura Toi. She also owns the Tangata Whenua Gallery in Ōpōtiki where she sells art works produced by herself as well as other Māori artists.

Honours and awards 
In 2003 Clay won Best self-employment business award in the Maori businesswomen awards. In 2016 Clay was the recipient of the Molly Morpeth Canaday 3D local Merit award and the Whakatāne Society of Arts and Crafts Local Art Award.

Exhibits 

 Mataraupo, Te Koputu a te whanga a Toi — Whakatane Library and Exhibition Centre, 9 December 2017 to 4 February 2018.
 The Real Opotiki, Studio One Toi Tū, 2017.

References 

1960 births
Whakatōhea people
New Zealand Māori weavers
20th-century New Zealand women artists
21st-century New Zealand women artists
Women textile artists
People from Ōpōtiki
Living people